Cem Sevim (born 1973) is a Turkish footballer. He played for Vefa Spor Külübü, Koy Hızmetleri, Nevsehir Spor, Istanbulspor, and St. Albans during his career.

References

Istanbulspor https://web.archive.org/web/20151204125635/http://www.istanbulspor.com.tr/anahaber.asp?
Vefa Spor Külübü https://web.archive.org/web/20151208162439/http://www.vefaspor.com/index.php

1973 births
Living people
Turkish footballers
Place of birth missing (living people)
Association footballers not categorized by position